Abdoel Rivai (Palembayan, Agam, West Sumatra, August 13, 1871 - Bandung, West Java, October 16, 1937) (EYD: Abdul Rivai) was a physician and journalist in the Dutch East Indies. He supported the end of Dutch rule there.

Personal life 
Rivai was of Minangkabau descent. His father was a teacher at a school in Sumatra. He studied at the Javanese Doctor School (STOVIA), before completing his study and received 'the Arts' in Amsterdam, Netherlands.

Career 
In the Netherlands, Rivai taught Malay language at Berlitz and was actives as a writer. In 1899, he launched his magazine Pewarta Wolanda. Of his controversial writings, the most famous was Demoralisasi Orang Jawa in which he said that Javanese poverty was caused by culture and poor education. After met Clockenner Brousson, he changed Pewarta Wolanda into a twice weekly magazine known as Bendera Wolanda. In 1910, after completed his education, Rivai moved to Jakarta where he sat as editor of Bintang Timoer. In addition to his writings about the Indonesian independence movement, he was elected to the Indonesian Volksraad in 1918.

References 
Poeze, Harry A. (1986) Di Negeri Penjajah : Orang Indonesia di Negeri Belanda 1600 - 1950
Rivai, Abdul. Student Indonesia di Eropa. Laporan November 1926 - Mei 1928

External links
 Profil di PWI

1870s births
1937 deaths
Minangkabau people
Writers from the Dutch East Indies